Forge FC is a Canadian professional soccer club based in Hamilton, Ontario, that competes in the Canadian Premier League, the top tier of Canadian soccer. The club plays its home matches at Tim Hortons Field. Forge FC joined the CPL in 2019 as one of the league's seven inaugural teams.

The club won the first two championships of the Canadian Premier League, winning back-to-back league titles in 2019 and 2020 before winning a third title in 2022. Forge was the first CPL side to compete in a continental competition when it qualified for the 2019 CONCACAF League, and the first to compete in the highest tier of continental competition in the 2022 CONCACAF Champions League. Forge became the first Canadian Premier League club to reach the final of the Canadian Championship, which they did in 2020.

History 

Hamilton was linked to a professional soccer team as early as June 2013, when reports first emerged of a professional soccer league launching in Canada. Hamilton Tiger-Cats owner Bob Young was part of a group of investors, predominantly from the Canadian Football League, working with the Canadian Soccer Association and president Victor Montagliani.

In February 2016, the ownership group sought permission from Hamilton City Council to erect a dome over the Tim Hortons Field playing surface to allow for year-long activity, including soccer. When the Canadian Premier League was officially announced, it was revealed that Hamilton's club would be the flagship franchise.

On May 6, 2017, Hamilton was one of two cities accepted by the Canadian Soccer Association for professional club membership when the Canadian Premier League was unanimously approved.

Forge FC was officially unveiled as the league's sixth team on July 12, 2018. The club revealed its crest, colours and branding, as well as its place in the league for the 2019 launch season. The name was chosen to represent city's industrial heritage and forging ahead building its future.

Bobby Smyrniotis era 
On October 1, 2018, Forge FC announced that Bobby Smyrniotis would be its first head coach and technical director. On November 29, 2018, Kyle Bekker and Chris Nanco were announced by the club as its first signings, coinciding with event that consisted where each team unveiled its initial player signings.

2019 season 
 
The club played its first ever game on April 27, 2019, in the CPL's inaugural match against York9 FC. As one of the league's 'inaugural teams', the club competed against FC Edmonton and Valour FC for a spot in the 2019 CONCACAF League, qualifying after defeating Valour FC 2–0 on June 16, 2019. In their debut international match, Forge defeated Antigua GFC 2–1 on aggregate in the two-leg preliminary round series to advance to the round of 16. There, Forge FC was eliminated 4–2 on aggregate by Honduran club Olimpia.

Forge FC won the league championship in their inaugural season after defeating Cavalry FC 2–0 on aggregate in the 2019 CPL Finals. Golden Boot winner Tristan Borges scored the opening goal during the first leg on October 26 in Hamilton. David Choinière scored the final goal late in stoppage time during the second leg, held on November 2 in Calgary.

2020 season 
Due to the COVID-19 pandemic, the CPL delayed the 2020 Canadian Premier League season and played it as a shortened bubble tournament at the University of Prince Edward Island. There, Forge defended their title, defeating HFX Wanderers FC 2–0 in the CPL Final with goals from Alexander Achinioti-Jönsson and Maxim Tissot.

In the CONCACAF League, Forge defeated Municipal Limeño and Tauro in single-leg away matches before falling to Haitian club Arcahaie on penalties in the quarter-finals. The club had one final chance to qualify for the CONCACAF Champions League in a play-in match, but were defeated by Honduran club Marathón.

2021 season 
In the club's 2021 season, Forge competed in the CONCACAF League for a third consecutive season. This year, the club advanced to the semi-finals for the first time, coming from behind in the quarter-finals to defeat Santos de Guápiles 4–3 on aggregate to qualify for the 2022 CONCACAF Champions League. Domestically, Forge finished first in the CPL and qualified for the CPL Final, but were defeated 1–0 by Pacific FC, ending the club's quest for a third consecutive title.

2022 season 
On January 2, 2022, the club reorganized its ownership under the newly announced Hamilton Sports Group, an entity that will also own the Hamilton Tiger-Cats and the master licence for Tim Hortons Field. Bob Young continues to serve as chairman and the largest shareholder while also welcoming new investment from Hamilton-based steel company Stelco (represented by its chairman and CEO Alan Kestenbaum), club CEO Scott Mitchell, and Woodbine Entertainment CEO Jim Lawson. On February 16, 2022, Forge FC became the first Canadian Premier League team to participate in the CONCACAF Champions League, hosting Cruz Azul in a 1–0 loss, and eliminated by them in the first round, 4–1 on aggregate.

During the CPL season, captain Kyle Bekker and four other players recorded their 100th match with the club. Each of these players was presented with a commemorative Forge jersey with the kit number 100 at a home match.

On October 30, Forge FC defeated Atlético Ottawa 2–0 in the 2022 Canadian Premier League Final to claim their third CPL title.

Stadium 

The club plays its home games at Tim Hortons Field, a 23,218-seat multi-purpose stadium which had primarily been used for Canadian football. In the inaugural season, capacity was reduced to only allow spectators in the lower decks and club and suite facilities to provide an intimate setting for supporters. More recently, capacity has been reduced further with tickets now available only in the east side lower deck and the club and suite levels except for matches with a high demand.

The stadium opened in 2014 as the home venue for the Hamilton Tiger-Cats of the Canadian Football League, and was used as a soccer venue during the 2015 Pan American Games.

Crest and colours 
The crest is designed to represent both an "H" for Hamilton and "F" for Forge. The open space in the lettering represents a waterfall, and the three orange sparks represent Forge FC's city, community and club.

The club's secondary crest is a hammer with the 'H' of the primary crest at the head, with six stripes on the handle to represent the six municipalities amalgamated in 2001 to form the new City of Hamilton: Dundas, Ancaster, Stoney Creek, Flamborough, Glanbrook, and of course, Hamilton.

The official club colours "spark orange", "platinum steel" grey, and "waterfall white", symbolizing the sparks that come from the strike of a hammer, the local manufacturing industry, and the area's many waterfalls.

To celebrate Hamilton's founding date of June 9, 1846, Forge FC announced it would wear a black and gold uniform for the first home game in June, matching the city's traditional sporting colours worn by the Hamilton Tiger-Cats, the Hamilton Bulldogs, and the Hamilton Tigers. The club did so for its June 15, 2019 home game against Valour FC but has not followed through in subsequent seasons.

Club culture

Supporters
The Barton St. Battalion is Forge FC's only recognized supporters' group. Located in section 112 of Tim Hortons Field, the group was founded in February 2016 after details of the Canadian Premier League and a Hamilton club emerged. At the club's official launch, supporters of the group sat behind the stage and were revealed as the club's first 75 founding members.

Mascot
The club mascot is Sparx, a large orange hammer-wielding dragon. He was unveiled to the public on April 18, 2019, before his debut at Forge FC's inaugural match on April 27, 2019.

The Anvil
Starting in the 2022 season, the club began celebrating home victories by having a prominent player from the match strike an anvil before the Barton St. Battalion.

Rivalries

Forge has a rivalry with Toronto-based York United FC, with matches between the two club referred to as 905 derbies. As two of the founding members of the Canadian Premier League, the clubs contested the league's inaugural league match on April 27, 2019 at Tim Hortons Field which ended in a 1–1 draw.

A competitive rivalry with Calgary-based Cavalry FC developed during the 2019 season, as the clubs broke out as the league's top teams and faced off nine times, including meetings in the Canadian Championship and the CPL Finals. The natural rivalry has been described as the best in the league.

Honours
 Canadian Premier League
Champions: 2019, 2020, 2022
Runners-up: 2021
Regular Season: 2021
Runners-up: 2019, 2022

 Canadian Championship
Runners-up: 2020

Canadian Premier League Awards

CONCACAF League Awards

Players and staff

Roster

Staff

Head coaches

Club captains

Record

Year-by-year

Key to colours and symbols:

Key to league record:
 Season = The year and article of the season
 Pld = Matches played
 W = Matches won
 D = Matches drawn
 L = Matches lost
 GF = Goals scored
 GA = Goals against
 Pts = Points
 PPG = Points per game
 Pos = Final position

Key to cup record:
 DNQ = The club did not qualify
 R1 = First qualifying round
 R2 = Second qualifying round, etc.
 R16 = Round of 16
 QF = Quarter-finals
 SF = Semi-finals
 RU = Runners-up
 W = Winners

International competition
 Scores and results list Forge FC's goal tally first.

References

External links 

 

 
Canadian Premier League teams
Association football clubs established in 2017
2017 establishments in Ontario
Soccer clubs in Hamilton, Ontario